Ioannis Drymonakos (born 18 January 1984) is a Greek swimmer from Athens. He became the first ever Greek swimmer to hold a European swimming record by clocking a time of 1:54.16 seconds in 200 m butterfly event of the 2008 European Aquatics Championships final on 21 March 2008.

In 2008, a few days before the Beijing Olympic Games he tested positive for banned drugs during a doping-control test.

He was then acquitted of all charges for use of banned substances by the court, that decided it was impossible for him to procure the substance M3 [11].
He came back in 2010 winning the bronze medal at the European Championship in Budapest in the event of 200 m butterfly.

In 2012 he won two more bronze medals at the European Championship in Debrecen. At the 2012 Summer Olympics in London, he competed in the 200-meter butterfly where he placed 15th overall.

In 2015, Ioannis Drymonakos participated at the Arena Pro Swim Series at Charlotte by U.S.A swimming during his effort to get to 2016 Summer Olympics and taking the competitive advantage among many distinguished athletes such as Michael Phelps. He competed in Friday's (15 May) 400 meters Men IM making it in 04:20.26 and breaking his personal record for over 2 seconds to hold the 4th place. On Saturday's (16 May) 200 meters Men Butterfly made it in 1:59:61 holding the 5th place.

In 2018 he competed in the Survivor reality contest.

References

Sources
Giota Kounali, "duo-fores-nikhse-ton-felps-o-drymwnakos", Sport24.gr, Athens 2015.

1984 births
Living people
Greek male swimmers
Male butterfly swimmers
Olympic swimmers of Greece
Swimmers at the 2000 Summer Olympics
Swimmers at the 2004 Summer Olympics
Swimmers at the 2012 Summer Olympics
Medalists at the FINA World Swimming Championships (25 m)
European Aquatics Championships medalists in swimming
Mediterranean Games gold medalists for Greece
Mediterranean Games bronze medalists for Greece
Swimmers at the 2005 Mediterranean Games
Mediterranean Games medalists in swimming
Swimmers from Athens
Survivor Greece contestants